or  is a lake that lies on the border of the municipalities of Sørfold and Hamarøy in Nordland county, Norway.

See also
 List of lakes in Norway
 Geography of Norway

References

Sørfold
Hamarøy
Lakes of Nordland